Lee v. Washington, 390 U.S. 333 (1968), is a United States Supreme Court decision that upheld an appeals court decision to forbid segregation of public prisons.

Background
The state of Alabama segregated its jails, juvenile jails, and prisons based on race.  White prisoners were housed separately from African-American prisoners.  In 1966, American Civil Liberties Union leader Charles Morgan, Jr. filed suit against Alabama, asking that the jails and prisons be desegregated.   This was 12 years after the landmark Supreme Court case Brown v. Board of Education which outlawed school segregation.

The United States District Court for the Northern District of Alabama found in favor of the prisoners, and ordered Alabama to desegregate its jails and prisons. Alabama had argued that segregation was necessary in order to maintain security and minimize violence, but the Appeals court held that "this Court can conceive of no consideration of prison security or discipline which will sustain the constitutionality of state statutes that on their face require complete and permanent segregation of the races in all the Alabama penal facilities. We recognize that there is merit in the contention that in some isolated instances prison security and discipline necessitates segregation of the races for a limited period. However, recognition of such instances does nothing to bolster the statutes or the general practice that requires or permits prison or jail officials to separate the races arbitrarily. Such statutes and practices must be declared unconstitutional in light of the clear principles controlling."

Opinion of the Court 
Alabama appealed to the Supreme Court, which upheld the Appeals court decision in a very brief per curiam opinion. Justices Black, Harlan, and Stewart collectively wrote a concurring opinion in which they explicitly say that "prison authorities have the right, acting in good faith and in particularized circumstances, to take into account racial tensions in maintaining security, discipline, and good order in prisons and jails."

See also 
 Brown v. Board of Education

References

External links
 
 

1968 in United States case law
African-American history of Alabama
American Civil Liberties Union litigation
Civil rights movement case law
Penal system in Alabama
United States First Amendment case law
United States Fourteenth Amendment case law
United States Supreme Court cases
United States Supreme Court cases of the Warren Court
United States racial desegregation case law